The National Electoral Commission is the electoral commission of Iceland. It plays an important role in the preparation and execution of elections to Althing, the Parliament of Iceland. In addition it is responsible for apportioning seats to each constituency as decreed by law.

References

External links
Official website

Elections in Iceland
Independent government agencies of Iceland
Iceland